Feng Xi (died 222), courtesy name Xiuyuan, was a military general of the state of Shu Han in the Three Kingdoms period.

Life
Feng Xi was from Nan Commandery (南郡), which is around present-day Jingzhou, Hubei. He served as a general under Liu Bei, the founding emperor of the state of Shu Han in the Three Kingdoms era.

In 221, Liu Bei attacked his former ally, Sun Quan (the founding emperor of Eastern Wu), after the latter broke their alliance and seized his territories in Jing Province and executed his general Guan Yu. Feng Xi participated in this campaign, which led to the Battle of Xiaoting (or Battle of Yiling) of 221–222. In the initial stages of the battle, Feng Xi and Wu Ban defeated Sun Quan's officers Li Yi (李異) and Liu E (劉阿) in the area near the Wu Gorge and pressed further towards Zigui County. Feng Xi was then appointed as the Grand Viceroy (大督) of the Shu army. In the summer of 222, Sun Quan's forces, led by Lu Xun, suddenly launched a counterattack after about six months of stalemate since the beginning of 222. Feng Xi was killed in battle by the subordinates of the Wu general Pan Zhang and his unit suffered heavy casualties.

Appraisal
In his Ji Han Fuchen Zan, the Shu writer Yang Xi (楊戲) attributed Feng Xi's downfall to his overconfidence and underestimation of the enemy.

See also
 Lists of people of the Three Kingdoms

References

 Chen, Shou (3rd century). Records of the Three Kingdoms (Sanguozhi).
 Pei, Songzhi (5th century). Annotations to Records of the Three Kingdoms (Sanguozhi zhu).
 Sima, Guang (1084). Zizhi Tongjian.

Year of birth unknown
222 deaths
Shu Han generals
Three Kingdoms people killed in battle